Leonid Vasilyevich Potapov (4 July 1935 – 12 November 2020) was the President of the Buryat Republic in Russia from August 1991 to July 2007. He was reelected three times (in 1994, 1998 and 2002); in 2002 he received 68% of the vote.

Biography
Potapov was born in Uakit, Buryatia. In 1959 he graduated as an Engineer from Khabarovsk Institute of Railway Transport. From January to April 1990 he was nominal Vice President (Vice Chairman of Supreme Council) of Turkmen SSR. In April 1990 he returned to Buryatia and was nominated as a local communist party chief (1st secretary of CPSU Buryatian branch). In October 1991 he became Chairman of the Supreme Council. 

He died from COVID-19 on 12 November 2020, aged 85.

Honours and awards
 Order of Merit for the Fatherland;
 3rd class (7 August 2007) - for outstanding contribution to strengthening Russian statehood and many years of diligent work
 4th class (11 May 1998) - for outstanding contribution to the socio-economic development of the republic, strengthening friendship and cooperation between nations
 Order of Friendship (26 June 1995) - for services to the state, achievements in work and significant contribution in strengthening friendship and cooperation among peoples and selfless actions in rescuing the dying
 Order of October Revolution
 Order of the Red Banner of Labour
 Order of the Badge of Honour
 Distinguished Engineer of the Buryat ASSR
 Honorary citizen of the city of Ulan-Ude
 Honorary Professor of the Buryat State University, Modern University for the Humanities, Irkutsk State University, Irkutsk State Technical University and the Plekhanov Russian Economic University

References

External links
 Official presidential website

1935 births
2020 deaths
People from Buryatia
Heads of the Republic of Buryatia
Members of the Federation Council of Russia (1994–1996)
Members of the Federation Council of Russia (1996–2000)
Recipients of the Order "For Merit to the Fatherland", 3rd class
Deaths from the COVID-19 pandemic in Russia